X-Men  is a comic book ongoing series featuring the titular namesake team of superheroes, published in various incarnations by Marvel Comics, beginning in 1963.

During its revival under writer Chris Claremont, the first series was eventually renamed The Uncanny X-Men with issue #114 (October 1978). In 1991 a second companion series debuted, marking the first time that more than one X-Men series would be published. This series took the simpler, earlier name X-Men, though from 2001 until 2004 it became the flagship title of the X-Men franchise and was published as New X-Men.  The title then was briefly reverted to its original name but then subsequently renamed X-Men: Legacy. 

Volume 3 began publication in September 2010 and, for most of its run featuring team-ups between the X-Men and other Marvel characters, ended at issue #41 in February 2013. As part of Marvel NOW!, the title was relaunched as a new series (volume 4) written by Brian Wood and featuring an all-female team.

In July 2019, Marvel announced at the San Diego Comic-Con that X-Men would be relaunched as the flagship title again in October 2019 following Jonathan Hickman's House of X and Powers of X, with Hickman writing and art by Leinil Francis Yu. As the fifth volume of the title, the series ran for 21 issues, before it was subsequently relaunched as volume 6 - written by Gerry Duggan - in July 2021.

Publication history
The 2010 X-Men series was the third ongoing series to launch with the title following the first series (vol. 1) in 1963 and the second series (vol. 2) in 1991. To distinguish itself from the other contemporary X-Men titles, this third volume of X-Men was conceived as a title that would focus on the mutants' role in the wider Marvel Universe and "...firmly integrate the X-Men in the Marvel Universe." As a result, the initial story arcs featured a guest appearance from characters from the Marvel Universe ranging from Spider-Man to Blade.

From issues #30 to 37 the title took a change in direction, focusing on Storm leading a security team of X-Men and dropping the 'team-up' element that was previously a part of the book.  The team-up elements were briefly brought back in issues #38 and 39.

Volume 4 (2013)
As part of Marvel NOW!, the series ended at issue #41 in February 2013.  A new volume of the title written by Brian Wood, who also wrote issues #30 to 37 of the previous volume,  began in May 2013. For the first time in the history of the X-Men franchise, the book features a roster composed entirely of female X-Men, with an initial roster of Jubilee, Storm, Rogue, Kitty Pryde, Rachel Grey and Psylocke.

Marc Guggenheim took over the title starting with issue #18. X-Men was then cancelled, with issue #26 being its last issue.

Volume 5 (2019-)

As part of Marvel's "Dawn of X" initiative following Hickman's relaunch of the Marvel X-Men line, X-Men relaunched in October 2019, written by Hickman and with art by Yu. Although the first cover featured the extended Summers family (Cyclops, Havok, Vulcan, Corsair, Cable, Jean Grey, Rachel Summers) with Wolverine, Hickman had stated that this book is intended to be an "all-encompassing mutant title" and the cast may change.

Volume 6 (2020-)

Plot summary

Volume 3 (2010 series)
The first story arc, "Curse of the Mutants," comprising issues #1–6, involves the X-Men battling the vampire nations and teaming up with Blade.

The second story arc, "To Serve and Protect," comprising issues #7–10, involves the team of Storm, Gambit, Emma Frost and Wolverine returning to New York, where they team up with Spider-Man to battle the Lizard and the Dark Beast in the sewers of Manhattan.

An interlude story then followed with Professor X telling Jubilee of an earlier encounter he had with the vampire Raizo Kodo. This was followed by the "First to Last" storyline, which began with X-Men Giant-Size #1 and saw the original X-Men appear in flashback scenes of a previously untold adventure.

Another one-shot story saw a team of X-Men team up with the new female Ghost Rider to battle a mystical enemy. The most recent storyline featured the Future Foundation teaming up with the X-Men, where they also encountered Skull the Slayer. Following on from the 2011 "Regenesis" event among the X-titles, Marvel have announced that X-Men will be among the titles aligned with Cyclops's vision of the X-Men and feature a more covert group of characters, with Colossus, Domino, Jubilee, Psylocke, Storm and Warpath being the initial lineup. The team-up aspect of the title remained, with the first arc featuring War Machine. This was followed by the return of Raizo Kodo for an arc dealing with Jubilee's vampirism.

The title then took on a change in direction; with the exits of Warpath and Jubilee from the cast and the addition of Pixie, the storyline focused on Storm leading a "security team" of X-Men dealing with potential threats to mutants.

Issue #38 featured a return to the team-up elements of the book and features Domino and Daredevil.

Volume 5 (2019 series)
Following the events of House of X and Powers of X, the mutants of the world attempt to adjust to their new lives on the Krakoa and face the challenges of building a mutant society. Cyclops, having chosen to live on the Moon, invites his father Corsair to a family dinner and gives him a Krakoan flower so that he is able to visit the island whenever he wants. The Orchis Initiative, still recovering from their defeat during House of X/Powers of X, are dealt another blow when Cyclops, Storm, Magneto and Polaris liberate captured mutants from one of their vaults; however, their director, Devo, is optimistic about his plans to get revenge on the mutants. Arakko, a new sentient island, appears near Krakoa and the two appear to be moving towards one another, so Cyclops, Prestige and Cable head to Arakko to investigate and find the island swarming with monsters. An envoy is sent to meet with the X-Men, but a miscommunication leads to a fight before Prestige is able to facilitate a parley. The envoy reveals that the two islands are reuniting after a long estrangement and later meets with Apocalypse, warning him of a coming danger. When the guardian of the Krakoan gate to the Savage Land is bypassed, Pixie and Anole are attacked by a group of elderly women wielding advanced weaponry who somehow managed to pass through the gate, despite not being mutants. The compromising of one of its gates causes Krakoa great pain, which is felt by the telepaths on the island, prompting the Krakoan Council to send Cyclops, Emma Frost and Sebastian Shaw to investigate. The group, Hordeculture, is composed of radical botanists and bioengineers who, tired of humanity poisoning Earth, have enacted a plan to take control of the world's food supply; however, the emergence of Krakoa has unexpectedly altered their plans and they now require some Krakoan flowers to further their research. They manage to defeat the X-Men and retreat with their samples, while Cyclops and the others report the threat to the council. Meanwhile, Professor X, Magneto, Apocalypse, Cyclops and Gorgon attend an economic conference in Switzerland, where various world dignitaries ask them about their plans as a nation. Professor X senses assault groups closing in on them and sends Cyclops and Gorgon to take care of them while Magneto fields questions, criticising the human race for all of its shortcomings in regards to how it treats its people. Xavier reveals to the dignitaries that their assault teams have been taken care of and that, while he reiterates his love for both humans and mutants, this type of aggressive behaviour will not be tolerated by Krakoa.

While pursuing a posthuman who escaped from the Orchis vault, Wolverine is called back to Krakoa when she returns to the vault and locks herself inside of it. After consultation with Professor X and Magneto, he is redeployed with Cyclops, Storm and Armor to act as a distraction for the vault's defence system while X-23, Darwin and Synch infiltrate it. Five months later, the team still have not returned and Cyclops laments his decision to send them inside. It is revealed that, during their attack on Orchis, Mystique was tasked with planting a Krakoan gateway so that the mutants would be able to spy on the Initiative, with Mystique agreeing on the promise that the council would resurrect her wife Destiny. After subsequently dying during the mission and being resurrected, Magneto tells her that they will not bring Destiny back until Mystique can prove she succeeded and send her back to the Orchis space station. While there, she disguises herself as a researcher and is given a component by Devo to deliver to his chief scientist Doctor Gregor, who is attempting to resurrect her husband who was killed by the X-Men during the attack. Mystique reports what she has learned but Magneto and Professor X explain that she must do more before they will bring Destiny back, enraging her. Mystique remembers one of Destiny's prophecies, telling her about Krakoa and warning that she would be denied of the one thing she wanted. Destiny advises her to bring her back to life at all costs, burning the island to the ground if necessary.

Cast

Volume 3 (2010 series)

Volume 4 (2013 series)

Volume 5 (2019 series)

Volume 6 (2021 series)

Contributors

Regular writers
Victor Gischler (2010–2012)
Chris Yost (2011)
Brian Wood (2012)
Seth Peck (2012-2013)
Brian Wood (2013-2014)
Marc Guggenheim (2014)
G. Willow Wilson (2015)
Jonathan Hickman (2019–2021)
Gerry Duggan (2021–present)

Regular artists
Paco Medina (2010–2011)
Chris Bachalo (2011)
Jorge Molina (2011)
Will Conrad (2012)
David López (2012)
Paul Azeceta (2012-2013)
Olivier Coipel (2013)
David Lopez (2013)
Terry Dodson (2013-2014)
Harvey Tolibao (2014)
Roland Boschi (2015)
Leinil Yu (2019–2020)
R.B. Silva (2020)
Matteo Buffagni (2020)
Mahmud Asrar (2020–2021)
Phil Noto (2020)
Brett Booth (2021)
Francesco Mobili (2021)
Nick Dragotta (2021)
Russell Dauterman (2021)
Lucas Werneck (2021)
Sara Pichelli (2021)
Pepe Larraz (2021–present)

Prints

Volume 5 (2019 series)

Collected editions

Volume 3 (2010 series)

Volume 4 (2013 series)

Volume 5 (2019 series)

Volume 6 (2021)

References

External links